The Americus Hotel is an historic hotel, which is located in Allentown, Pennsylvania. It was built between 1926 and 1927, and is a thirteen-story yellow brick building.

It was listed on the National Register of Historic Places in 1984. The hotel reopened in 2021, and is a member of Historic Hotels of America.

Overview
The Americus is a classic 1920s Jazz Age hotel built by a group of Allentown businessmen who wanted to erect a first-class hotel in the city's central business district. Designed to be a public facility available to customers of diverse economic backgrounds, rather than a palatial private "pleasure dome" of nineteenth-century robber barons, its owners planned to provide the best that world-class service and up-to-date technology could offer to its patrons.

History

The site of the Americus Hotel had been used as a hotel since 1810, when the population of Allentown (then known as Northampton) was approximately seven hundred. In that year, Abraham Gangawere built a two-story tavern on the northeastern corner of 6th and Hamilton Streets. Later, under the ownership of Charles Seagraves, one of the leading men of nineteenth-century Allentown, the inn was enlarged and renamed as the Northampton Inn. President Martin Van Buren subsequently slept here in 1837.

During the days before automobile use became popular, a stagecoach line, of which Seagraves was one of the owners, made its headquarters here. Later renamed as the American Hotel, the hotel had expanded in size to five stories by World War I. Used frequently by local salesmen and the traveling public, it became known for its excellent cuisine.

Construction
Following its nineteenth-century success, the old hotel gradually declined. In 1924, Aaron Potruch purchased the hotel's lot from George W. Seagreaves' estate for $500,000. Planning on building a new hotel and office building, he cleared the ground and tore down the hotel. A month later, however, Potruch was contacted by Albert D. "Bert" Gomery, who suggested that his idea of a new hotel was something of a local joke. Over the years, according to press accounts, many new hotels had been proposed but never built. 

Gomery, as he was known to his friends, was president of Allentown's Chamber of Commerce in 1925. Born in Lehighton, the fifty-year-old businessman had come to the city in 1894. With his brother J. Edgar, he had built the wholesale produce firm of Gomery Brothers into a prosperous company. In 1917, Gomery had branched out by purchasing from the Allentown College for Women (later Cedar Crest College) its building at 4th and Turner streets. This he converted into the College Hotel. But unlike other builders, Gomery was leaving nothing to chance. Marshaling the full weight of his business influence, he formed a company with his brother, who was now co-partner with fellow Allentonian John C. Schwartz in Gomery & Schwartz of Philadelphia. This partnership was the agent for the Hudson Motor Car Co. in eastern Pennsylvania, New Jersey and Delaware. Also included was Allentown National Bank cashier Frank Cressman. Along with W.A. Gibson of Philadelphia, they created the American Hotel Realty Co.

That winter, after an architectural competition, the Philadelphia firm of Ritter and Shay was awarded the contract. Their plans called for a two-hundred-and-seventy-bedroom structure. After the first round of bids was submitted, Gomery found them too high, and the bid process was repeated. After negotiations, the two sides reached a compromise: two more floors were added, giving a total of three hundred and twenty-four bedrooms. Presumably this was done to increase the number of less-expensive rooms, thus making the hotel more attractive to business travelers.

In June 1926, the construction contract was awarded to the Philadelphia firm of Roberts and Roller. The work crews dug a new hole for the foundation, but work on the new building did not actually begin until July 17, 1926. As the weeks passed, the rigid steel skeleton of the Americus began to rise. At first, it was nothing more than a clatter of riveting jackhammers. But on the street level, its outline began to take shape. With its buff-colored brick, curved Romanesque arches and romantic if somewhat superfluous balconies, it echoed Coolidge-era America's passion for the exotic world of old Spain.

Construction went ahead rapidly. Gomery had promised that the building would be finished by Sept. 10, 1927, but things did not run smoothly. First, there were problems with the foundation. The high cost of materials also caused delays. But Gomery persisted, supervising every detail, including the commission of Philadelphia artist George Harding to create the large murals for the hotel.

Golden era
 Despite the delays, the Americus Hotel opened for business only three days behind schedule on Sept. 13, 1927. In the newspapers of the day, it was reported that the hotel lounge was sunlit through large, full-length windows. The floors were built with colorful tiles; the furniture included overstuffed sofas and chairs. 

Hanging on one wall was a painting of a Spanish dancing girl that depicted "the life of entertainment," observed a reporter from Allentown's Morning Call. The kitchen staff of twenty-two was overseen by Swiss chef Werner Kloetzli, "formerly of the Palmer House, Chicago," and maitre d'hotel Frederick Botta, who "assured a cuisine that is second to none in the country." According to the reporter, as soon as one entered the building, one felt a "changed atmosphere" that created "an air of refinement, just a little bit different, that persists on intruding itself as the splendor of the surroundings unfolds." Newspaper accounts also described the highly polished walnut furniture, travertine marble floors, colorful Harding murals, and polychrome chandeliers, which created a mood in which one could "visualize the glories of old Spain.

Advance reservations were required for the official opening, which took place on the evening of September 13. When the guest list reached seven hundred, many hoping to attend were turned away. At 6:30 p.m., guests in tuxedos and evening gowns arrived to make an inspection tour. Serenaded by a twenty-eight-piece orchestra that was directed by Albertus Meyers, the guests gathered in the hotel's dining room. Floral displays at strategic locations added to the Spanish garden atmosphere. A series of storefronts for tailors and watch repairmen were rented to various small businesses outside of the hotel, on North 6th Street.

For the next forty years, the Americus Hotel served as a centerpiece of the downtown business and retail district of Allentown. Many celebrities and notable people who visited the city stayed here, and it was common for the hotel to hold various receptions, balls, and high school graduation proms in its ballroom.

Decline
In the late 1970s, as the downtown area of Allentown began to change and decline, the fortunes of the hotel mirrored those of the city. Added to the National Register of Historic Places on August 23, 1984, its owners, the Moffa family, signed an agreement with developers to sell the hotel for $2 million, which included tax credits for restoring the building's original character.

On August 7, 1985, the Moffa family sold the property to twenty-nine-year-old Mark Mendelson, who bought the hotel from Albert and Anna Moffa for $1.25 million. Equibank provided the loan for the mortgage. Former Allentown Mayor Joseph Daddona at that time called the deal "the most exciting thing in this part of town in many years."

Although Mendelson stated that he had invested millions of dollars in the hotel and historic preservation organizations gave awards to Mendelson, city construction permit records show that he had, in reality, only spent hundreds of thousands of dollars, not including amenities such as new furniture or improvements that didn't require permits. The most notable improvements were in the hotel's dining room and ballrooms. The hotel was able to bolster its image in 1988, however, by taking on the imprint of the Radisson Hotel chain.

But the Americus ultimately lost its affiliation with Radisson in 1994, due to late payments and bounced checks. With nearly $5 million in liens against the hotel, it was put up for tax sale. When no other potential owners stepped forward to bid on the property and assume responsibility for the unpaid bills, Mendelson remained in charge, and began paying off a portion of the hotel's back taxes. During this time, the Americus became part of the Clarion chain in 1995 but continued to spiral downward with broken elevators, leaky plumbing and accumulating garbage. By 1998, the Clarion affiliation was also over. In response to the mounting problems, city inspectors cancelled the hotel's health license. Then, in August 2002, after a series of fires, broken pipes and elevator failures, the city of Allentown revoked the occupation permit of the hotel entirely, and its residents were forced to vacate the property.

A series of legal battles between Mendleson and the city subsequently ensued with the hotel remaining vacant. Unpaid assessments to the Downtown Improvement District Authority increased to $21,744, back taxes and fines climbed to roughly $37,000, and a water and sewer bill reached nearly $145,000 before Allentown officials finally targeted the property for sheriff's sale.

Scaffolding and canvas were subsequently erected on the sidewalk both on Hamilton Street, as well as on North 6th Street, to prevent falling masonry from injuring pedestrians. The storefront businesses on North 6th were ordered to close due to the building's deterioration, and the city then also ordered that utilities to the building be cut off in 2005. In 2007, the Americus was ordered sealed for public health and safety reasons. In 2009, Mendleson filed for Chapter 11 bankruptcy and the city of Allentown assumed ownership due to the $600,000 tax lien it held on the property.

Redevelopment
In 2009, local businessman Albert Abdouche obtained ownership of the deteriorating hotel from the city for $676,000, announced re-development plans, spent $3.2 million to obtain the property, and started improving it in February 2010. Over the next few years, the interior and exterior were repaired.

In early 2014, Abdouche applied for funding from the Allentown Neighborhood Improvement Zone (NIZ) Development Authority. The project received a tentative go-ahead in February of that year with $13.2 million in NIZ tax revenues to include eighty-five hotel rooms, forty-eight apartments, ten retail storefronts, commercial office space, a street-level sports bar, and restaurants. In return, Abdouche agreed to an independent review of the project to ensure that his construction estimates were correct. He also agreed to post a bond so that, if the costs proved higher than projected, the Directors of the NIZ would be able to select another developer to finish the project. 

The newly renovated hotel reopened on July 27, 2021, and, in 2022, was inducted into Historic Hotels of America, a program of the National Trust for Historic Preservation.

See also
 List of historic places in Allentown, Pennsylvania

References

External links 

 Official website

History of Allentown, Pennsylvania
Hotel buildings on the National Register of Historic Places in Pennsylvania
Hotel buildings completed in 1927
Hotels established in 1927
Buildings and structures in Allentown, Pennsylvania
National Register of Historic Places in Lehigh County, Pennsylvania
Historic Hotels of America